Pieter van der Werff (1665 – 26 September 1722) was a Dutch Golden Age painter. He assisted his older brother, Adriaen van der Werff.

Life
He learned to paint from his brother Adriaen and according to the RKD, he spent most of his life working in Rotterdam, where he painted the rich and famous. There is possible evidence he might have travelled to England to seek commissions as two portraits painted c.1709 of an unknown gentleman and unknown woman hang in the Victoria Art Gallery Bath, their alternative titles being John Churchill, First Duke of Marlborough and Sarah, Duchess of Marlborough.
Whilst in England he may have had commissions from the Fairfax family – a long established Yorkshire Catholic family who owned extensive land and property in the county.

Works

Portrait of Adriaen Paets (1690-1720), two portraits
Portrait of Adriaen Besemer (1690-1722)
Portrait of Cornelis de Koningh (1690-1722)
Portrait of Paulus Verschuur (1690-1722)
Portrait of Gerard van Bergen (1695-1722)Portrait of Cornelis van den Bergh (1695-1722)Portrait of Johan van der Bergh (1695-1722)Portrait of Joost van Coulster (1695-1722)Portrait of Cornelis Jansz Hartigsvelt (1695-1722)Portrait of Willem HartigsveltPortrait of Johan Kievelt (1695-1722)Portrait of Ewoud Pietersz (1695-1722)Portrait of Johan de Reus (1695-1722)Portrait of Dominicus Rosmale (1695-1722), Portrait of Pieter Sonmans (1695-1722)Portrait of Johan van der Veeken (1695-1722)Portrait of Johan de Vries (1695-1722)Portrait of Philip William August, Count Palatine of Neuburg (1690s)Portrait of Jacob Dane (1700)Portrait of a Cornelis Matelief de Jonge (1700)Granida and Daifilo (1711)Portrait of a Woman, presumably Elisabeth Hollaer, wife of Theodorus Rijswijk (1710s)Lot and his DaughtersPortrait of Hendrik NobelPortrait of a Gentleman (1709) (alternative: John Churchill (1650-1722), 1st Duke of Marlborough), Victoria Art Gallery, Bath, EnglandPortrait of a Woman (1709) (alternative: Sarah, Duchess of Marlborough) 1709, Victoria Art Gallery, Bath, EnglandPortrait of a Gentleman, (c.1700) (alternative: John Dann (1660-1722), partner in Coggs & Dann, London Goldsmith Bankers, 
 Portrait of a Lady (1705) possibly Eliza Dann, wife of John Dann, of Coggs & Dann London Goldsmith Bankers,
 Portrait of a Gentleman'', (1704), Fairfax house, York England

Public Art Galleries and Museums
Some of the artist's paintings feature amongst the following collections:

USA
 Detroit Institute of Arts, Michigan USA - 'The Repentant Magdalen, 1711'
UK
 Fitzwilliam Museum, University of Cambridge, England - 'Bacchus and Ariadne' 1712
 Victoria Art Gallery, Bath, England -portraits of 'Gentleman and Lady' -alternatives: 'John & Sarah Churchill', Duke & Duchess of Marlborough 1709
 Lamport House, Northamptonshire, England, 'man with cat and birdcage within an arch' 
 Nottingham City Museum and Galleries, England, 'Christian de Weerdt' 
 Pollok house, Glasgow, Scotland, 'Saint Mary Magdalen' c.1707-1722'
 Erddig Estate, Wrexham, Wales, 'The Expulsion of Adam and Eve' (attributed), National Trust
 Wellcome Collection, London, England, 'Portrait of a Man' (attributed)
RUSSIA
 Hermitage Museum, Saint Petersburg, Russia - 'Peter the Great'
FRANCE
 Louvre Paris, - 'Adam and Eve'
NETHERLANDS
 Rijksmuseum, Amsterdam - 'A Girl Drawing and a Boy near a Statue of Venus'
 Museum Boijmans Van Beuningen, Rotterdam - 'self portrait', 'The Penitent Magdalen'
DENMARK
 Statens Museum for Kunst (National Gallery of Denmark), Copenhagen

References

External links
 Pieter van der Werff in the Rijksmuseum
 Artclyclopedia

1665 births
1722 deaths
Painters from Rotterdam
18th-century Dutch people
Dutch Golden Age painters
Dutch male painters
18th-century Dutch painters
18th-century Dutch male artists